IBLA International Competition is a Sicilian music competition.

Praise
The IBLA Awards have been officially commended by New York City Mayor Rudolph W. Giuliani, New York State Governor George E. Pataki, United States Senator Alfonse M. D'Amato, Empire State Development Chairman Charles Gargano and IBLA winners have received critical acclaim by such writers as Pulitzer Prize winning music critic Martin Bernheimer on MSNBC Living's Young Artists Series.

Participants
Each summer hundreds of pianists, singers, composers and instrumentalists representing Italy, France, Germany, England, Spain, Portugal, Ireland, Austria, Switzerland, Norway, Sweden, Finland, Denmark, the Netherlands, Belgium, Greece, Turkey, Poland, Hungary, Bulgaria, Romania, Slovenia, Serbia, Albania, the Czech Republic, Belarus, Estonia, Lithuania, Ukraine, Russia, Kazakhstan, Armenia, Azerbaijan, the Republic of Georgia, Uzbekistan, Siberia, India, Pakistan, Vietnam, Singapore, Philippines, Indonesia, Australia, China, Japan, Korea, Taiwan, Hong Kong, New Zealand, Israel, Syria, Lebanon, Egypt, Ghana, South Africa, Brazil, Argentina, Venezuela, Peru, Puerto Rico, the Dominican Republic, Canada and the United States come to the IBLA Grand Prize International Music Competitions, which take place in Ragusa Ibla, Sicily, with hopes of being selected for the IBLA International Roster.

While in Sicily, through the co-operation of the Mayors of Chiaramonte, Comiso, Ispica, Pozzallo, Santa Croce, Camerina and Vittoria, outstanding musicians are given the opportunity to perform in open-air concerts for the citizens of each of these communities.

In the words of journalist, music critic and IBLA jury member Gordon Sparber,
"... the sunbaked island of Sicily, the largest and historically richest in the Mediterranean, is the scene of the IBLA Grand Prize, a music competition held in a hall buried among the clusters of 17th - 18th - century stone buildings that crowd the little threads of streets. The rocky town ... lies just a few miles from where the Ionian and Mediterranean meet at Sicily's southernmost tip. Hearing piano-playing in this kind of setting is amazing. It is, I imagine, like opening an ornate and ancient casket only to find it is stocked with glittering gems."

Honors
The 2001 IBLA Awards at Lincoln Center's Alice Tully Hall were in memory of Lucia Evangelista, beloved wife of Jerome Hines, who was in her own right a great and noted soprano in the international community of operatic music.

The jury
The IBLA International Jury is the largest and most diverse among international competitions and comprises representatives from the most important music institutions worldwide such as:
Marcello Abbado, former Director of the Giuseppe Verdi  Conservatory in Milano,
Howard Aibel, Piano Faculty at the University of Northern Iowa,
Licia Albanese,  Chairperson of The Licia Albanese-Puccini Foundation in New York,
Sarah Arneson, Voice Faculty at Boston University,
Hasmig Baghadjian, Piano Faculty at the Higher National Conservatory in Beirut,
Sherman Banks, Commissioner of the Sister Cities program in Little Rock,
David Bender, Voice Faculty at  New York University,
Angela Boone, IBLA International Advisor,
Victor Bunin, Piano Faculty from the Damascus Conservatory,
Renè Clemènt, Director of the Music Conservatory  of Lyon,
Joseph H. Conlin, Impresario from New York City,
Agata DeMartino, President Amici della Musica of Ragusa,
Kyoko Edo, President of the Edo Foundation in Tokyo,
Victoria Fisher, piano faculty at Elon College, Gloria Gari, IBLA International Adviser,
Vakhtang Jordania, Conductor of  Russian Federal Orchestra, St. Petersburg Festival Orchestra and the Kharkov Philharmonic Orchestra,
Carla Giudici, former Piano Faculty at the Santa Cecilia Conservatory in Rome,
Margaret  Hanegraaf, Voice Faculty, Cedar Arts Center in Corning, New York,
Frank Heneghan, former Head of the Dublin Institute of Technology Conservatory of Music in Dublin, Ireland
Jeffrey James, Project Director of Angelok Classics Records and President  of Jeffrey James Arts Consultant / 4tay Records,
George Kern, Piano Faculty at the Salzburg Academy of Music,
Fernando Laires, Piano Faculty at the Eastman School of Music and President/Founder of the American Liszt Society,
Eric Larsen, Piano Faculty at the North Carolina School of the Arts, Director of Meadow Mount School of Music
Vladimir Leyetchkiss, Piano Faculty at DePaul University in Chicago 
Sheila McKenna, Director of the Preparatory Department at the College Conservatory of Music in Cincinnati,
Barbara Meister, IBLA International Advisor,
Victoria Mushkatkol, Piano Faculty at the Juilliard School,
Malek Jandali, Piano Faculty from Atlanta, USA
Tatsuya Nagashima, Director of the Lishmoa Institute of Music in Tokyo, Japan
Ksenia Nosikova, Piano Faculty at the University of  Iowa,
Sheryl Overholt, Voice Faculty at Purchase College-Conservatory State University of New York,
Gunther Reinhold, Piano Faculty at the Staatliche Hochschule für Musik Karlsruhe,
Baroness Titetta Savarese Cafici, Artistic Director of the Lyceum Concert Series in Catania,
Bela Siki, Piano Faculty at the University of Washington,
Irina Skvortsova, International Cultural Exchange Foundation in Russia,
Gordon Sparber, journalist and music critic,
Peggy Spence, Piano Faculty at the University of Central Oklahoma,
Jan Pokorny Steele, Piano Faculty at the University of Central Oklahoma and Founder/President of Chopin Society of Mid-America,
Ruth Thomas, Trustee of the Menuhin Foundation in Bermuda,
Paola Tumeo, soloist, Violin Faculty of Conservatory Giuseppe Verdi Torino - Italy, former co-leader of Orchestra and Filarmonica Teatro alla Scala, Milano
Ireneus Zuk, Piano Faculty / Director of the School of Music at Queen's University in Kingston, Canada and
Luba Zuk, Piano Faculty at McGill University in Montreal.

Winners
Since the first edition of the IBLA Grand Prize on the occasion of the Christopher Columbus Festival 1492-1992 celebrating the 500th anniversary of the discovery of America, the IBLA Foundation has been dedicated to discovering new talent from around the world. Winners are assisted in establishing concert careers by facilitating their access to performance venues and professional contacts.

Throughout the years the IBLA Grand Prize winners have received the opportunity to be presented in such prestigious venues as Alice Tully Hall at Lincoln Center, Tokyo Opera City Concert Hall, Tchaikovsky Bolshoi Hall in Moscow, Carnegie Recital Hall and to perform for the President of Italy, Oscar Luigi Scalfaro at the Great Hall of the University of Rome, for world-renowned Metropolitan Opera sopranos Licia Albanese and  Anna Moffo at Steinway Hall and at the United Nations' Dag Hammarskjöld Auditorium. With the support of  Baroness Mariuccia Zerilli-Marimò, IBLA Winners have also performed at New York University's Casa Italiana Zerilli Marimò for Metropolitan Opera soprano and Lucine Amara, for pianists Jerome Lowenthal of the Juilliard School, Ursula Opens from Northwestern University and for Mario Delliponti of the Giuseppe Verdi Conservatory in Milano. With the support of the Honorable Senator Yvette Swan, Minister of Cultural Affairs, IBLA winners have been presented in Bermuda on the occasion of the Life Time Achievement Awards. IBLA Winners have also been presented in performance/seminar at McGill University in Montreal and at the Queen's University in Kingston, Canada as well as at the Juilliard School, the University of Washington in Seattle, the North Carolina School of the Arts and the University of Arkansas. In cooperation with the YAMAHA Corporation of America, IBLA Foundation offers a Master Class Series which enables winners to refine their performances through the experience of such masters as Fernando Laires and Nelita True of the Eastman School of Music and Jerome Lowenthal of the Juilliard School.

The IBLA Foundation with the cooperation of the Office of the Mayor, the Sister Cities Commission, Chamber of Commerce and the Public Library System of Little Rock, Arkansas, offers an annual tour of public concerts and community outreach programs which allows IBLA Winners to perform for and interact with hundreds of local students and families by sharing their professional experience and artistic talents.

Through the support of the late pianist Angel Chen, Executive Director of Angelok Records, the IBLA Jordania Prize has offered annually a Moscow debut and CD recording at the Tchaikowsky Bolshoi Hall with the Russian Federal Orchestra conducted by Maestro Vaktang Jordania.

Academic scholarships have been offered to IBLA Winners by the North Carolina School of the Arts, the University of Iowa, the University of Northern Iowa, Elon College in North Carolina, the University of SouthWestern Louisiana, the DIT Music College in Dublin and the Scicli International Music Academy in Sicily.

With the support of Chancellor Alexander Ewing from the North Carolina School of the Arts, the IBLA Foundation has also presented modern dance performances in Italy as well as in the USA through the Human Dance Company and the works of choreographer Michael Yasenak.

"Complex movements of human bodies symbolized the ambiguities of spiritual experience ... flesh and spirit carried on an especially intense conversation ... compelling ... their mystical fervor was combined with rational confusion .... mystery and ecstasy ... attested to Mr. Yasenak's powers of choreographic invention"

IBLA winners have received worldwide critical acclaim with praises.

References

External links
 IBLA Foundation Official organization website.

Music competitions in Italy